8th Cavalry may refer to:

Divisions 
 8th Cavalry Division (German Empire), a unit of the German Army during the First World War
 8th SS Cavalry Division Florian Geyer, a unit of the Waffen-SS during the Second World War

Brigades 
 8th (Lucknow) Cavalry Brigade, a unit of the British Indian Army during the First World War
 8th Cavalry Brigade (United Kingdom), a unit of the British Army during the First World War

Regiments 
 8th Cavalry Regiment, a unit of the United States Army
 8th Cavalry (British Indian Army) of the British Indian Army from 1846 to 1922, now part of the 3rd Cavalry regiment of the Indian Army
 8th Light Cavalry, a unit of the Indian Army from 1922 onwards
 8th Ohio Cavalry, a Union regiment during the American Civil War
 8th Regiment Illinois Volunteer Cavalry, a Union regiment during the American Civil War
 8th Texas Cavalry, popularly known as Terry's Texas Rangers, a Confederate regiment during the American Civil War
 8th Virginia Cavalry, a Confederate regiment during the American Civil War